Pfingstwiesengraben is a small river of Saxony-Anhalt, Germany. It flows into the Elbe near Magdeburg.

See also
List of rivers of Saxony-Anhalt

References

Rivers of Saxony-Anhalt
Rivers of Germany